Ptolemaeus is an ancient lunar impact crater close to the center of the near side, named for Claudius Ptolemy, the Greco-Roman writer, mathematician, astronomer, geographer and astrologer. It measures approximately 154 kilometers in diameter.

Description 
To the south-southwest, Ptolemaeus is joined to the rim of the crater Alphonsus by a section of rugged, irregular terrain, and these form a prominent chain with Arzachel to the south. To the southeast is Albategnius and to the north is the smaller but well-defined Herschel.

The features of Ptolemaeus are highlighted when the Sun is at low angles during the first and last quarter. At full Moon the Sun is directly overhead and the crater contours become more difficult to discern.

The crater has a low, irregular outer rim that is heavily worn and impacted with multiple smaller craters. The rim has a discernibly polygonal shape, although overall it remains circular. The largest of the peaks along the rim, designated Ptolemaeus Gamma (γ), has an altitude of 2.9 km and is located along the northwest rim. The crater has no central peak, a lava-flooded floor, and lacks a ray system. Impact sites of this form are often classified as walled plains, due to their resemblance to the maria.

The somewhat dark-hued floor of Ptolemaeus is notable for several ghost craters, formed where lava has covered a pre-existing crater. These leave only a slight rise where the rim existed, and are difficult to detect except at low angles of sunlight. There are also multiple smaller craters across the floor surface, most notably Ammonius in the northeastern quadrant.

On either side of this crater are linear, irregular gashes in the lunar surface, forming valley-like features. These features are approximately parallel to each other and radiate from the direction of Mare Imbrium to the north-northwest.

Satellite craters 

By convention these features are identified on lunar maps by placing the letter on the side of the crater midpoint that is closest to Ptolemaeus.

The following crater has been renamed by the IAU.
 Ptolemaeus A — See Ammonius.

See also
Ptolemaeus (Martian crater)
4001 Ptolemaeus

References

External links

Ptolemaeus at The Moon Wiki
I-556 Ptolemaeus - USGS Geological Atlas of the Moon, 1966
 
 
 
 
  - one of three craters making up a Triad - that includes Ptolemaeus
 
 
 

 
 
 

Ptolemy
Impact craters on the Moon